The Telekom S-League, commonly known as just the Solomon Islands S-League or more simply the S-League for sponsorship reasons, is a semi professional league and the top division of the Solomon Islands Football Federation. It was known as the Solomon Islands National Club Championship from 2000 until 2010, when the official name was changed.

Format
In the current format, all teams compete in a round robin, where the team that ends at the first place are crowned champions. Together with the second-placed team, they qualify for the OFC Champions League. The bottom team is then relegated to the Second Division, while the best performing team from that league is promoted to this league.

History

Interprovincial Tournament (1977–85) 
This tournament had begun the early football in Solomon Islands. It was held by the FA of the Solomon Islands.

National Club Championship (2000–10)
The Solomon Islands S-League was founded in 2000, with Koloale taking out the first premiership title. The final championship was the 2009–10 season, with the next season renamed to the Telekom S-League.

The Knockout Championship (2011–12)
All teams of the league played a knockout tournament after the 2010–11 and 2011–12 seasons, called the Knockout Championship. The winners of both competitions played a two legged play-off for a place in the OFC Champions League. In the case of the 2011–12 season play-off, Solomon Warriors won both these competitions and automatically qualified. The 8-team competition was abandoned in the 2013–14 season due to the increase of teams from 8 to 9.

Telekom S-League (2010–present)
In 2011, the competition was renamed to the Telekom S-League. Marist, Koloale, Kossa, Solomon Warriors, Makuru, Hana, Western United and Fasi Roos participated in the initial season of the new league. The first inaugural S-League was won by Koloale.

Teams
Central Coast (Honiara)
Henderson Eels (Honiara)
Honiara City (Honiara)
Isabel United (Isabel Province) 
Kossa (Honiara)
Laugu United (Honiara)
Malaita Kingz (Malaita) until 2021
Marist (Honiara)
Real Kakamora (Makira-Ulawa)
Solomon Warriors (Honiara)
Southern United (Honiara)
Teams as of the 2020–21 season.
Kula FC
Waneagu United
Teams as of the 2021 season.

Previous Winners

Performances

Performance by club

Top scorers

Most goals in a single game
 11 goals:
 Raphael Lea'i (Henderson Eels) 19-0 against Real Kakamora in season 2019-20.

Hat-tricks

References

 
1
Solomon Islands
2000 establishments in the Solomon Islands
Sports leagues established in 2000